Jacques Cristofari (born 8 August 1978, in Bastia) is a French former professional footballer who played as a defender.

He played one match in Ligue 1 for SC Bastia, coming on as a substitute in a 1–1 draw with Le Havre on 16 January 1999.

External links
 
 Jacques Cristofari profile at foot-national.com

1978 births
Living people
Association football defenders
French footballers
Ligue 1 players
SC Bastia players
US Boulogne players
CA Bastia players
Borgo FC players
Gazélec Ajaccio players
Footballers from Corsica